Catharine Selden (dates not known) was an Irish writer of Gothic novels in the early 19th century. 

Little known today, she was "prolific" and her novels "best-selling" for her publisher, Minerva Press. She published seven novels.  The first, The English Nun (1797), was written in imitation of Diderot's La Religieuse (1792).

Bibliography
 The English Nun: a Novel (London, 1797)
The Count de Santerre (1797)
Lindor; or Early Engagements (1798)
Serena (1800)
The Sailors (1800)
 German Letters (Translator, Cork, 1804)
Villa Nova: or, The Ruined Castle (1805)
Villasantelle, or The Curious Impertinent (1817)

References

Writers of Gothic fiction
Year of birth unknown
Year of death unknown
19th-century British women writers
19th-century British writers
19th-century British novelists
British women novelists